North Carolina's 5th House district is one of 120 districts in the North Carolina House of Representatives. It has been represented by Republican Bill Ward since 2023.

Geography
Since 2023, the district has included all of Hertford, Gates, Pasquotank, and Camden counties. The district overlaps with the 1st and 3rd Senate districts.

District officeholders since 1989

Election results

2022

2020

2018

2016

2014

2012

2010

2008

2006

2004

2002

2000

References

North Carolina House districts
Hertford County, North Carolina
Gates County, North Carolina
Pasquotank County, North Carolina
Camden County, North Carolina